Capolicchio is a surname. Notable people with the surname include:

Lino Capolicchio (born 1943), Italian actor, screenwriter, and film director
Lydia Capolicchio (born 1964), Swedish journalist and hostess

Italian-language surnames